Yumuktepe (or Yümüktepe) is a tell (ruin mound) at  within the city borders of Mersin, Turkey. In 1936, the mound was on the outskirts of Mersin, but after a rapid increase of population, the mound was surrounded by the Toroslar municipality of Mersin.

Discovery and excavations 

Excavations during 1936-1938 by a British archaeologist John Garstang (1876–1956). He was the founder of the British Institute in Ankara, have revealed a neolithic settlement which continued up to medieval ages. However, the excavations halted during World War II and some documents in the Liverpool University have been lost after an air raid. After the war, John Garstang as well as Veli Sevin of Istanbul University and Isabella Caneva  of Sapienza University of Rome continued the excavations.

Archaeology 

There are 23 levels of occupation dating from ca. 6300 BC. In his book, Prehistoric Mersin, Garstang lists the tools unearthed in the excavations. The earliest tools are made of either stone or ceramic. Both agriculture and animal husbandry (sheep, cattle, goats and pigs) were among the economic activities in Yumuktepe. 
In the layer which corresponds to roughly 4500 BC, are found the remains of one of the earliest fortifications in human history to exist. According to Isabella Caneva, during the chalcolithic age an early copper blast furnace was in use in Yumuktepe.

Historical era 

Yumuktepe was a part of Kizuwatna, a vassal kingdom of Hittite Empire. In a document of 1440 BC, a city named Pitura was mentioned. Pitura might be the ancient name of the settlement. But a recent research suggests Elipru as the original name of the settlement. It seems, like most Hittite lands, Sea Peoples from Europe plundered Yumuktepe in 13th century BC. A second blow was from Assyrian Empire from Upper Mesopotamia. During Roman Empire, a small city named Zephyrium was established to the south of Yumuktepe. But Emperor Hadrian (reigned 117–138) renamed the city as Hadrianapolis. During the early Byzantine Empire, the nearby settlement of Soli ( at the west) flourished and Yumuktepe further lost its former status.

References 

Ruins in Turkey
Former populated places in Turkey
Tumuli in Turkey
Tourist attractions in Mersin
Buildings and structures in Mersin
Archaeological sites in Mersin Province, Turkey